Platypectrum platyceps, the Arfak cannibal frog, is a species of frog in the family Limnodynastidae.
It is endemic to West Papua, Indonesia.
Its natural habitats are subtropical or tropical moist montane forests, freshwater marshes, and intermittent freshwater marshes.

It was classified in the former genus Lechriodus until its synonymization with Platyplectrum in 2021.

References

Platyplectrum
Amphibians of Western New Guinea
Amphibians described in 1940
Taxonomy articles created by Polbot